Hamzehabad-e Olya (also Romanized as Ḩamzehābād-e ‘Olyā; also known as Ḩamzehābād-e Bālā) is a village in Lahijan-e Gharbi Rural District, Lajan District, Piranshahr County, West Azerbaijan Province, Iran. At the 2006 census, its population was 155, in 21 families.

References 

Populated places in Piranshahr County